Vikulovsky District  is an administrative district (raion), one of the twenty-two in Tyumen Oblast, Russia. As a municipal division, it is incorporated as Vikulovsky Municipal District. It is located in the east of the oblast. Its administrative center is the rural locality (a selo) of Vikulovo. Population: 16,435 (2010 Census);  The population of Vikulovo accounts for 42.6% of the district's total population.

References

Notes

Sources

Districts of Tyumen Oblast